Arquímedes Herrera (August 8, 1935 – May 30, 2013) was a Venezuelan track and field athlete who competed in the sprint events and was ranked #4 in the world in the 100 m in 1963. As a teenager Herrera spent time in the Venezuelan military, taking up his athletics career after his discharge. He claimed three medals at the 1963 Pan American Games held in São Paulo, Brazil. In the final of the 200m dash three athletes crossed the finish line with the same time 21.2 seconds. The Photo finish defined the Venezuelan Rafael Romero stay with gold medal; American Ollan Cassell, with silver; and  Herrera, with the bronze. In 1964 he equaled the world record 200-meter dash in 20.5 seconds and also participated at the 1964 Summer Olympics in Tokyo, Japan, where he made the semi-finals in both the 100 metres and 200 metres and was a member of the Venezuelan team which finished sixth in the final of the 4 × 100 metres relay.

Herrera was a claimant to the Masters M35 100 metres world record, running a hand timed 10.3 while taking a silver medal in the 1970 Bolivarian Games in Maracaibo on August 29, 1970.  In the transitional period, hand times were acceptable.  His record held until it was beaten by an automatically timed 10.28 by Olympic champion Allan Wells almost 17 years later.  The record was beaten intrinsically by an automatic 10.50 set by Delano Meriwether at the Penn Relays in 1979.  Four days later, Herrera added the M35 200 metres record at 21.5.  That record lasted was tied two years later but not surpassed for almost 6 years.

After his sports career ended, he worked as a coach and as a judge with the Venezuelan Athletics Federation.

References

External links
Biography (Spanish)
Obituary (Spanish)

1935 births
2013 deaths
Athletes (track and field) at the 1963 Pan American Games
Athletes (track and field) at the 1964 Summer Olympics
Olympic athletes of Venezuela
Venezuelan male sprinters
Pan American Games silver medalists for Venezuela
Pan American Games bronze medalists for Venezuela
Pan American Games medalists in athletics (track and field)
Central American and Caribbean Games silver medalists for Venezuela
Central American and Caribbean Games bronze medalists for Venezuela
Competitors at the 1962 Central American and Caribbean Games
Central American and Caribbean Games medalists in athletics
Medalists at the 1963 Pan American Games
People from Zulia
20th-century Venezuelan people
21st-century Venezuelan people